Fluocinolone is a synthetic glucocorticoid corticosteroid which was never marketed. The acetonide cyclic ketal of fluocinolone, fluocinolone acetonide, in contrast, has been marketed.

References

Diketones
Fluoroarenes
Glucocorticoids
Polyols
Pregnanes